Petra Polášková is a retired Czech football midfielder. She has played throughout her career for 1.FC Slovácko in the Czech First Division.

She has been a member of the Czech national team.

References

1979 births
Living people
Czech women's footballers
Czech Republic women's international footballers
People from Slavičín
1. FC Slovácko (women) players
Women's association football midfielders
Czech Women's First League players
Sportspeople from the Zlín Region